Sparganothoides teratana is a species of moth of the family Tortricidae. It is found in Panama and Honduras.

The length of the forewings is 8.1–9.1 mm. The ground colour of the forewings is brown to brownish orange, with yellowish-brown to light brown basal fascia. The hindwings are marked with grey.

References

Moths described in 1877
Sparganothoides
Moths of Central America